Plikiškiai is a village in Lithuania. Since ancient times here is Plikiškiai booming agriculture and developed a high level agriculture. There are historical structures.

Villages in Šiauliai County